Vendin-le-Vieil is a commune in the Pas-de-Calais department in the Hauts-de-France region of France.

Geography

Population

Places of interest
 The church of St.Leger, rebuilt along with the rest of the town, after World War I.
 The modern church of St. Auguste.

See also
Communes of the Pas-de-Calais department

References

External links

 Official town website 
 Website of the Communaupole de Lens-Liévin

Vendinlevieil
Artois